Babur (1483–1530), born Zahīr ud-Dīn Muhammad, was the founder and first Emperor of the Mughal dynasty in South Asia'

Babur may also refer to:
 Babur (cruise missile), a Pakistani short-range missile
 Babur, Iran (disambiguation), places that share the name
 Babur Square, in Andijan, Uzbekistan
 Book of Babur (or Baburnama), the memoirs of Ẓahīr-ud-Dīn Muhammad Bābur
 PNS Babur, several ships in the Pakistani navy
 Babar, 1960 Indian film by Hemen Gupta, starring Gajanan Jagirdar as the emperor

See also
 Babar (disambiguation)
 Babor (disambiguation)
 Shahenshah Babar, 1944 Indian film about the emperor
 Babr, a genus of amphipod crustaceans in the family Pallaseidae
 Gardens of Babur, a park in Kabul, Afghanistan
 Lower Babur, a village in Arghandab District, Kandahar Province, Afghanistan